Qui c'est les plus forts? is a 2015 French film directed by Charlotte de Turckheim.

Background
The film is an adaptation of Sunderland, a 2011 play written by Clément Koch.

Summary
Samantha, who works in a chicken factory in Saint-Étienne, loses her job. She lives with her best-friend Céline. She is also her little sister Kim's guardian and must find another job quickly or run the risk of losing her sister. She meets Paul, a lawyer who would like to raise a child with his partner. As a result, he asks Samantha if she would like to be hired as his surrogate.

Cast
Alice Pol as Sam
Audrey Lamy as Céline
Bruno Sanches as Dylan
Anna Lemarchand as Kim
Grégory Fitoussi as Paul
Julia Piaton as Pépin
Charlotte de Turckheim as Madame Galacher
Catherine Hosmalin as Solange
Daniel Lobé as Gordon
Barbara Bolotner as Valou
Émilie Gavois-Kahn as Employment Center hostess

Critical reception
Reviewing it for Têtu, a French gay magazine, Paul Parant called it, "a perfect mix of seriousness and irony, at times leading to moments of genuine laughter." He went on to highlight its "good acting and well-written script."

References

External links
imdb

2015 films
2010s French-language films
French LGBT-related films
French comedy-drama films
Saint-Étienne
Films about surrogacy
2015 comedy-drama films
LGBT-related comedy-drama films
2015 LGBT-related films
2010s French films
French pregnancy films